Fomichi is the name of several rural localities in Russia:
Fomichi, Kishertsky District, Perm Krai, a village in Kishertsky District, Perm Krai
Fomichi, Permsky District, Perm Krai, a village in Permsky District, Perm Krai